2K1 may refer to:

 the year 2001
 2K1 Mars, Soviet missile system
 NBA 2K1, 2000 video game
 NFL 2K1, 2000 video game
 World Series Baseball 2K1, 2000 video game